The Mainkreis (German: [River] Main Circle) was one of the 15 administrative districts of the Kingdom of Bavaria between 1806 and 1837. The district was named after its main river Main and renamed Obermainkreis (Upper Main Circle) in 1817. It was the predecessor of the  Regierungsbezirk Oberfranken (Administrative Regional District of Upper Franconia).

Independent cities

 Bamberg
 Bayreuth (since 1812)
 Hof an der Saale (since 1812)
 Schweinfurt (since 1810)

Subdivisions
The district was divided in the following judicial districts (Landgerichte = LG), according to the original borders of the districts of the former territories (Herrschaftsgerichte = HG):

 Bamberg I
 Bamberg II
 Banz LG (since 1813 HG)
 Burgebrach
 Ebermannstadt
 Ebnath HG (since 1816)
 Ebrach
 Eschenbach (since 1810)
 Gefrees (since 1812)
 Gleusdorf
 Hallstadt
 Heinersreuth HG (since 1816)
 Höchstadt (since 1810)
 Hof an der Saale (until 1812)
 Hollfeld
 Kemnath (since 1810)
 Kirchenlamitz (since 1812)
 Kronach
 Kulmbach (since 1812)
 Lauenstein
 Lichtenfels
 Mitwitz HG (since 1813)
 Münchberg (since 1812)
 Naila (since 1812)
 Neustadt an der Waldnaab (since 1810)
 Pegnitz (since 1812)
 Pottenstein (since 1810)
 Rehau (since 1812)
 Scheßlitz
 Schweinfurt (until 1810)
 Selb (since 1812)
 Seßlach (since 1812)
 Stadtsteinach
 Tambach HG (since 1814)
 Teuschnitz
 Tirschenreuth (since 1810)
 Waldsassen (since 1810)
 Weidenberg (since 1812)
 Weismain
 Wunsiedel (since 1812)

History
In the years between 1806 and 1808 the Kingdom of Bavaria was divided in 15 (state) districts, whose names were taken from their rivers. The Mainkreis, with Bamberg as its capital, was initially composed of 18 rural divisions and, since 1809, of the independent cities of Bamberg and Schweinfurt. In 1810 it grew significantly with the annexation of the Naabkreis. It was again enlarged when it received 12 rural divisions from the former Principality of Bayreuth, whereupon the district administration was moved to Bayreuth. In 1817, the Mainkreis was renamed Obermainkreis (District of the Upper Main River) and slightly expanded. At the same time, a new district with the name of Untermainkreis (District of the Lower Main) was created downriver. The Territorial Reorganization (Gebietsreform) of 29 November 1837, implemented at the request of King Ludwig I, split the judicial districts of the former Naabkreis from the Obermainkreis, assigning them to Oberpfalz (Upper Palatinate) instead, and renamed the shrunken Obermainkreis “Oberfranken” (Upper Franconia).

Literature
 (de) Handbuch der bayerischen Ämter, Gemeinden und Gerichte 1799–1980 (Guide of the Bavarian Districts, Municipalities and Courts 1799–1980), written by Richard Bauer, Reinhard Heydenreuter, Gerhard Heyl, Emma Mages, Max Piendl, August Scherl, Bernhard Zittel and edited by Wilhelm Volkert, Senior Professor at the University of Regensburg, Munich, 1983, 

Kingdom of Bavaria